Sad & Dangerous is the first major release by the Australian trio, Dirty Three. The album, recorded live at Scuzz Studio, includes ten songs from their gig-give-away demo cassette release.

Reception
Rolling Stone Australia said the album was, "Gently percussive, harshly percussive, tightly coiled and free-wheeling. The Dirty Three's second disc was steeped in the same exhilarating contradictions as their riveting live performances, invariably an emotional roller-coaster." The genre was described as, "As close to jazz as rock and roll, and a fair way from both."

Track listing
 "Kim's Dirt" (Kim Salmon) – 10:37
 "Killy Kundane" – 7:10
 "Jaguar" – 5:03
 "Devil In The Hole" – 4:20
 "Jim's Dog" – 6:30
 "Short Break" – 3:21
 "Turk Reprise" – 3:44
 "You Were A Bum Dream" - 5:06
 "Warren's Waltz" - 7:04
 "Turk" - 10:09

Personnel
Dirty Three
Warren Ellis - violin, bass on "Jim's Dog"
Jim White - percussion
Mick Turner - Guitar, bass, engineer
Technical
 Julian Wu - producer, engineer on "Turk Reprise"

References

1995 albums
Dirty Three albums

it:Dirty Three